Craftsbury is a town in Orleans County, Vermont, United States. The population was 1,343 at the 2020 census. The town includes the unincorporated villages of Craftsbury, Craftsbury Common, Mill Village, and East Craftsbury.

History
The state granted the town to Ebenezer Crafts, Timothy Newell, and sixty-two associates, on November 6, 1780. They named it Minden. It was changed to Craftsbury, in honor of Ebenezer Crafts, on October 27, 1790. Crafts was the first settler in the county.

North Craftsbury, later known as Craftsbury Common, was the first significant settlement in the town, and was for many years the center of culture and commerce, not only for Craftsbury, but for the greater region as well serving many of the neighboring towns. As mills multiplied around the town in the early 1800s additional settlements were made at Mill Village and in Craftsbury Village, while a predominantly Scottish settlement was made in East Craftsbury.

In 1840, the town needed 12 school districts to administer its schools, because of poor road infrastructure. There were 1,200 people, predominately engaged in farming. They owned 333 horses, 1,718 cattle, 3,166 sheep, and 658 pigs. The town had two gristmills, a hulling mill, two carding machine operations, ten sawmills, two fulling mills, three carriage makers, and one oil mill.

Geography
According to the United States Census Bureau, the town has a total area of 39.7 square miles (102.9 km2), of which 39.3 square miles (101.7 km2) is land and 0.4 square mile (1.1 km2) (1.11%) is water.

Craftsbury is on a plateau on the Catamount Trail.

There are many hills and valleys. The soil varies from alluvial meadows to clay and gravel. There are more numerous grades and varieties of soil than is usual.

There are five ponds or lakes.

Lake Elligo (also known as Eligo Pond) is partially in Greensboro. It is about two miles long and half a mile wide. Unusually, it has two outlets: one flows to the north and the other to the south. The northern outlet is one of the head branches of Black River. The southern flows through Little Elligo Pond and on to the Lamoille River in Hardwick. The eastern shore rises to cliffs. The western shore rises gradually. Near the center of the pond are two small islands. The lake was formerly a hunting-ground of the St. Francis Indians, who named it Elligo Scoloon.

The others are Great Hosmer Pond, lying partly in Albany, Little Hosmer Pond, and two other small ponds. The Black River is the main river in the town. It was called Elligo-sigo by the natives. Its current is slow. The drop from its source to Lake Memphremagog, including the falls at Irasburg and Coventry, is 190 feet. Wild branch, a tributary of the Lamoille, rises in Eden and flows through the western part of the town. The valley of the Black river in Craftsbury is a muck bed averaging a quarter of a mile in width.

Geology
Geologically, the town varies in its structure to an unusual degree. There is granite in the east part of town. This alternates with gneiss and mica slate. In the central portions of town, the previous rocks are replaced by dark argillaceous slate. This alternates with siliceous limestone. These rocks are from the Devonian Period and are part of the Waits River Formation.

The rocks on the west side of the Black River also vary.  These are older rocks from the Cambrian Period, Moretown Formation. State Route 14 runs along a seam where these east and west rock formation converge. Strata of mica slate, argillaceous, and chlorite slates, and limestones, alternate. An extensive deposit of gray granite is near Craftsbury village. It is broken on the surface. This rock is filled with nodules of black mica and quartz, in concentric layers. These are about one inch in diameter.

In much of the area, the biotite orbicules are so numerous that a hundred may be counted within a circle two feet in diameter. In some parts of the ledge these nodules are flattened, as if subjected to an immense vertical pressure when the mass was in a semi-fluid state. In the nineteenth century these rocks were once believed to be unique from any other found in America or Europe. Today, it is known that they resemble those found in Bethel granite.

As the last glacial period ended, part of the town became submerged under the transient Lake Winooski which drained when its ice dam melted 14,000 years ago.

Demographics

As of the census of 2000, there were 1,136 people, 427 households, and 301 families residing in the town.  The population density was 28.9 inhabitants per square mile (11.2/km2).  There were 572 housing units at an average density of 14.6 per square mile (5.6/km2).  The racial makeup of the town was 96.74% White, 0.35% African American, 0.09% Native American, 0.44% Asian, and 2.38% from two or more races. Hispanic or Latino of any race were 1.14% of the population.

There were 427 households, out of which 31.1% had children under the age of 18 living with them, 61.8% were couples living together and joined in either marriage or civil union, 5.9% had a female householder with no husband present, and 29.3% were non-families. 21.1% of all households were made up of individuals, and 9.4% had someone living alone who was 65 years of age or older.  The average household size was 2.43 and the average family size was 2.82.

In the town, the population was spread out, with 21.0% under the age of 18, 9.6% from 18 to 24, 24.6% from 25 to 44, 25.3% from 45 to 64, and 19.6% who were 65 years of age or older.  The median age was 41 years. For every 100 females, there were 91.2 males.  For every 100 females age 18 and over, there were 90.3 males.

The median income for a household in the town was $34,453, and the median income for a family was $41,000. Males had a median income of $21,875 versus $24,375 for females. The per capita income for the town was $17,185.  About 11.2% of families and 13.8% of the population were below the poverty line, including 15.4% of those under age 18 and 15.2% of those age 65 or over.

Town population reached its peak in 1860 with 1,413 people. It reached a low of 632 in 1970.

Government

Town

 Moderator – Jeannine Young
 Selectman – Bruce Urie
 Town Clerk – Yvette Brown
 Treasurer – Yvette Brown
 Collector of Taxes – Yvette Brown
 Auditor – Lisa Santamore
 Lister – Jim Whitby
 Lister – Barbara Paterson
 Lister – Anthony Aiossa
 Grand Juror – Carol Maroni
 Cemetery Commissioner – Bob Davis
 Tree Warden – James Moffatt
 Trustee of Public Funds – Rudy Chase
 Trustee of WWII Memorial Fund – Clyde Simmons Jr.
 Supervisor, Lamoille Solid Waste District – Adrian Owens
 Budget – $618,314

State Representatives

Craftsbury is represented in the Vermont General Assembly by two senators and two representatives, all elected for two-year terms.

For the purposes of representation in the House Craftsbury is part of the Orleans-Caledonia 1 district, which includes the towns of Barton, Glover, Sheffield, Wheelock, Albany Greensboro and Craftsbury. For 2009 and 2010 the representatives from this district were John Morley (a Republican) and John Rogers (a Democrat)

Education

Craftsbury is home to some uniquely small and historic educational institutions. Craftsbury Academy, located on Craftsbury Common is among the oldest and smallest public high schools in Vermont, and is part of the town's K–12 school system. Sterling College is nearby on Craftsbury Common and is a college of ecological thinking and action and is recognized as a Work College by the U.S. Department of Education.

Sterling College

Expand this section on Sterling College.

Public schools

Craftsbury runs the Craftsbury Schools System, which includes the historic Craftsbury Academy (grades 5–12), and Craftsbury Elementary (grades K–4). Craftsbury Schools is part of the Orleans Southwest Supervisory Union, which also operates five other public schools; Hardwick Elementary, Hazen Union High School, Lakeview Elementary, Wolcott Elementary, and Woodbury Elementary.
 Superintendent – Dr. David Baker
 FY 2020 Approved Budget – $3,951,349

Culture
The Craftsbury Chamber Players have offered summer performances since 1966.

Notable people 

 Edwin Eugene Bagley, composer
 Samuel C. Crafts, US congressman and senator; 12th governor of Vermont; one of town's founders
 Roger L. Easton, principal inventor and designer of the Global Positioning System (GPS)
 Horace F. Graham, 56th governor of Vermont
 Joseph W. Hoyt, Wisconsin legislator
 Bill "The Spaceman" Lee, pitcher with the Boston Red Sox (1969–1978) and Montreal Expos (1979–1982)
 Willard W. Miles, Associate Justice of the Vermont Supreme Court
 Leona May Smith (1914–1999), musician, co-founded and directed a summer music camp at Craftsbury, 1949–1957
 Burleigh F. Spalding (1853–1934), North Dakota lawyer, superintendent, politician, U.S. Representative, and Supreme Court Justice
 William Weston, politician who served in the Vermont Senate, lived and worked in Craftsbury

Craftsbury in film
Alfred Hitchcock shot the scenery for his 1955 movie The Trouble with Harry in Craftsbury. Ostensibly, the movie takes place entirely in town. Exteriors of the parsonage beside the East Craftsbury Presbyterian Church are used as well as exterior shots of Craftsbury Common. Assuming that the town would be in full foliage, the company showed up for outdoor shots on September 27, 1954. To the filmmakers' shock, there was hardly any foliage left; to achieve a full effect, leaves were glued to the trees.

The 1976 IMAX film To Fly!, a history of human flight, directed by Jim Freeman and Greg MacGillivray and produced for the Smithsonian Institution's National Air and Space Museum opens with a hot air balloon passing over the Wee House and the United Church of Craftsbury on the Common.

Economy

Tourist industry

The Craftsbury Outdoor Center has  of Nordic skiing trails, used for running in the summer months. The center is also home to the Green Racing Project, an Olympic development team with both rowing and skiing components.

In 1981, the first annual Craftsbury (winter) Marathon was held. In 2008, 646 skiers from 20 states and 3 provinces attended along with 295 tourists.

The Craftsbury Sculling Center is one of the oldest sculling programs in the United States, based on Little and Big Hosmer lake.

Agritourism is an important part of Craftsbury's economy. There are several farms, orchards, greenhouses and farmstands in Craftsbury, and there is a seasonal farmer's market at the Craftsbury Common every Saturday from 10am–1pm.

Transportation
Vermont Route 14 passes through town near the villages of Craftsbury and Craftsbury Common.

References

Further reading
Metraux, Daniel A. Craftsbury: A Brief Social History. Writers Club Press: 2001. .

External links

 Virtual Vermont Craftsbury web page
 Sterling College
 Craftsbury Outdoor Center
 History of Craftsbury from the Orleans County Historical Society

 
Towns in Vermont
Towns in Orleans County, Vermont